Arduin Character Sheets Combined Pak is a 1980 role-playing game supplement published by International Gamers Association.

Contents
Arduin Character Sheets Combined Pak is a set of character sheets for Arduin.

Arduin Character Sheets Combined Pak consisted of twenty-four character record sheets, each with a different character type depicted on the back.

Publication history
Arduin Character Sheets Combined Pak was written by David A. Hargrave, with art by Jeffrey W. Brain, and was published by Grimoire Games in 1980 as 24 cardstock sheets.

Reception
Steve Jackson reviewed Arduin Character Sheets Combined Pak in The Space Gamer No. 31. Jackson commented that "Character sheets are useful, and this one isn't bad. My only quibble is the price [...] most people would rather design their own and make photocopies. Not as pretty, but easier on the budget."

References

Arduin
Character sheets
Fantasy role-playing game supplements
Role-playing game supplements introduced in 1980